Na Záhradkách Stadium is a multi-use stadium in Rimavská Sobota, Slovakia.  It is used mostly for football matches and is the home ground of MŠK Rimavská Sobota.  The stadium holds 5,000 people.

Football venues in Slovakia
Buildings and structures in Banská Bystrica Region
Sport in Banská Bystrica Region